Samvel Melkonyan (born on 15 March 1984 in Yerevan, Armenian SSR, Soviet Union) is an Armenian former footballer who played as a winger. Samvel was also a member of the Armenia national football team, participated in 29 international matches since his debut at home 2006 World Cup qualification match against the Netherlands on 3 September 2005.

Club career
Samvel began his professional career playing for Spartak Yerevan. When Spartak merged with Banants, Samvel Melkonyan automatically transferred to Banants. He has been one of the stars at his new club for the past few years. Melkonyan transferred to Ukrainian club Metalurh Donetsk in 2008, but his spell there was not successful and he returned to Banants the following year.

Melkonyan transferred to Chernomorets Burgas in Bulgaria in January 2012. He made his first appearance on 4 March 2012 and had one assist in a 2–0 win for the team against CSKA Sofia.

Achievements
Alashkert
 Armenian Premier League: 2016-17

Banants Yerevan
 Armenian Cup: 2007

References

External links

1984 births
Living people
Footballers from Yerevan
Armenia international footballers
Armenian expatriate footballers
Armenian footballers
FC Urartu players
FC Metalurh Donetsk players
PFC Chernomorets Burgas players
Ulisses FC players
FC Gandzasar Kapan players
Armenian Premier League players
Ukrainian Premier League players
First Professional Football League (Bulgaria) players
Expatriate footballers in Ukraine
Armenian expatriate sportspeople in Ukraine
Expatriate footballers in Bulgaria
FC Alashkert players
Association football wingers